Out of a Dream may refer to:
 Out of a Dream (Ilse Huizinga album), 1997
 Out of a Dream (Reba McEntire album), 1979